Arnold Creek is a tributary of Middle Island Creek,  long, in West Virginia in the United States.

From this confluence, Arnold Creek flows generally northward through western Doddridge County.

According to the Geographic Names Information System, the creek has also been known historically by the spelling "Arnolds Creek."

Tributaries
This is a list of named streams in Arnold Creek's watershed.  By default, the list is ordered from the mouth of Arnold Creek to its source.

See also
List of rivers of West Virginia

References 

Rivers of West Virginia
Rivers of Tyler County, West Virginia
Rivers of Doddridge County, West Virginia